Trubchevsky District is an administrative and municipal district (raion), one of the twenty-seven in Bryansk Oblast, Russia. It is located in the south of the oblast. Its administrative center is the town of Trubchevsk. Population:   41,690 (2002 Census);  The population of Trubchevsk accounts for 39.7% of the district's total population.

References

Sources

Districts of Bryansk Oblast